Vincent Charles Hancock (born March 19, 1989, in Port Charlotte, Florida) is an American shooter and Olympian who won the gold medal in the men's skeet at the 2008 Summer Olympics in Beijing (with a then Olympic record), 2012 Summer Olympics in London and 2020 Summer Olympics in Tokyo. He is the first skeet shooter to repeat as the Olympic champion.

Biography
In 2005, at age of 16, Hancock won his first World Championship title in men's skeet and went on to win the prestigious International Shooting Sport Federation's Shooter of the Year award.  At the age of 20, Hancock wound up winning the gold medal in the World Championships in 2009.

Hancock later attended Troy University in Troy, Alabama, where he graduated in 2014 with a degree in business management.  After his graduation, Hancock became a sergeant in the U.S. Army Marksmanship Unit, and in 2015, Hancock became the third athlete to ever win three men's skeet World Championship gold medals. He has participated in 9 World Championships.

Following his gold medal win in the 2015 World Championships, Vincent qualified for the Olympic team and represented the United States in Rio in 2016.  His performance in the Rio Olympics though fell short, finishing in 15th place.

He qualified to represent the United States at the 2020 Summer Olympics, where he won his third Olympic gold medal, ahead of Jesper Hansen of Denmark and Abdullah Alrashidi of Kuwait.

Hancock is one of the most decorated shooters in the history of the sport, holding a total of 29 medals from various world competitions, including the Olympics.

Personal life

Hancock resides in Fort Worth, Texas, with his wife, Rebekah and their daughters, Bailey and Brenlyn. Hancock is a Christian.

Performance timeline

Skeet

Records

References

External links

Bio on results.beijing2008.cn
Bio on "USAShooting.org
Bio on Army.mil

1989 births
Living people
American male sport shooters
Medalists at the 2007 Pan American Games
Medalists at the 2011 Pan American Games
Medalists at the 2008 Summer Olympics
Medalists at the 2012 Summer Olympics
Medalists at the 2020 Summer Olympics
Olympic gold medalists for the United States in shooting
Olympic medalists in shooting
Pan American Games medalists in shooting
Pan American Games gold medalists for the United States
People from Port Charlotte, Florida
Shooters at the 2007 Pan American Games
Shooters at the 2011 Pan American Games
Shooters at the 2008 Summer Olympics
Shooters at the 2012 Summer Olympics
Shooters at the 2016 Summer Olympics
Shooters at the 2020 Summer Olympics
Skeet shooters
Sportspeople from Columbus, Georgia
United States Army soldiers
United States Distinguished Marksman
World record holders in shooting
20th-century American people
21st-century American people